Brigadier-General Goland Vanhalt Clarke, CMG, DSO (25 November 1875 – 27 August 1944) was a cavalry officer in the British Army, a big game hunter, naturalist and collector.

Early life
Clarke was born 25 November 1875 at Heywood Hall, Denstone, Staffordshire. He was educated at Winchester College and the Royal Military College, Sandhurst. After graduation he initially joined the 4th (Royal Irish) Dragoon Guards in March 1896, but on 13 January 1897 he transferred to the 18th (Princess of Wales's) Hussars as a second-lieutenant.

South Africa
Clarke took part in his first military action during the Second Boer War in South Africa (1900–1902). He was promoted to lieutenant on 24 February 1900, and appointed to the Distinguished Service Order (DSO), "for good service in Bruce Hamilton's operations in Ermelo District in December, 1901". Following the end of the war in June 1902, he returned to England on the SS Custodian, landing at Southampton in August.

Between wars
After the Boer War Clarke was promoted to captain on 28 September 1904. The same year as he became a member of the British Ornithologists' Union, their obituary on Clarke claimed he was "an exceptionally good field naturalist, and his knowledge of the breeding habits of European birds was extensive. He made collections in various parts of Europe and in Africa, and his name is commemorated by a species of Weaver named after him, Heterhyphankes golandi, the type of which is still unique". Clarke still a captain resigned his regular commission on 2 November 1907, but later joined the City of London Yeomanry (Rough Riders), part of the reserve Territorial Force, and was promoted to major on 4 July 1912.

First World War
At the start of the First World War, Clarke was the commanding officer of the Rough Riders, which was part of the London Mounted Brigade. The brigade with the rest of the 2nd Mounted Division were sent to fight the Ottoman Empire in the Gallipoli campaign. Notably during the battles for Sari Bair and Scimitar Hill.

When the British forces were withdrawn from Gallipoli, Clarke served in the Sinai and Palestine campaign. He was promoted to brigadier-general and given commend of the 7th Mounted Brigade, later the 14th Cavalry Brigade.

Clarke died at Maudlyn House, Steyning, Sussex, on 27 August 1944. He is commemorated at the Highbrook War Memorial. A plaque to the north of the choir reads "Praemium Virtutis Honor Brig.Gen. Goland Vanholt Clarke CMG, DSO C.O. City of London Yeomanry 1915-17  C.O. 7th Mounted Brigade, 14th Cavalry Brigade 1917-19 Seventh son of Stephenson Clarke Born 25/11/1875 Died 27/8/1944 Maudlyn House Steyning".

References

Bibliography

British Army personnel of the Second Boer War
British Army cavalry generals of World War I
Graduates of the Royal Military College, Sandhurst
Companions of the Order of St Michael and St George
Companions of the Distinguished Service Order
18th Royal Hussars officers
City of London Yeomanry (Rough Riders) officers
People educated at Winchester College
English hunters
1875 births
1944 deaths
People from the Borough of East Staffordshire
British Army brigadiers
Gallipoli campaign
Military personnel from Staffordshire